Klaus Allofs (born 5 December 1956) is a German former professional football player, manager, and executive.

A striker, Allofs was a prolific goalscorer for club and country. He amassed Bundesliga totals of 424 games and 177 goals over the course of 15 seasons (finishing as the league's top scorer on two occasions), playing mainly for Fortuna Düsseldorf and 1. FC Köln. His younger brother, Thomas, was also a professional footballer and also a striker, sometimes on the same team.

Allofs gained nearly 60 caps for West Germany, representing the nation in one World Cup and two European Championships, including the triumphant Euro 1980 tournament.

In 1999, after briefly working as a coach at Fortuna Düsseldorf, he became general manager at former club Werder Bremen, where he, in tandem with head coach Thomas Schaaf, helped the club to great success, winning the double of Bundesliga and DFB-Pokal in 2004, reaching the 2009 UEFA Cup final and qualifying for the UEFA Champions League six times.

Club career
Born in Düsseldorf, Allofs began playing professionally for home team Fortuna Düsseldorf, in 1975. He started his career as an attacking midfielder, and scored nearly 100 overall goals for the club, helping it to consecutive German cup wins, and often playing upfront with sibling Thomas. In 1978–79, he finished as the Bundesliga's top scorer, and also scored three in nine in Fortuna's UEFA Cup Winners' Cup runner-up run, including one in the final, an extra time loss against FC Barcelona.

In 1981 Allofs joined 1. FC Köln, where he continued scoring at an excellent rate. In 1985–86 he only tallied seven times in the league, one goal being from 70 metres out against Bayer Leverkusen (an intended pass to a breakaway forward that bounced over the advancing Leverkusen goalkeeper), but he added nine in as many matches in the UEFA Cup, as the team lost the final on aggregate to Real Madrid. In the following season, he re-partnered with Thomas, then left the country during three years, playing in France with Olympique de Marseille and FC Girondins de Bordeaux.

Allofs retired in June 1993, aged nearly 37, after three seasons with SV Werder Bremen, still managing to score regularly. In the 1991–92 Cup Winners' Cup he scored in the final against AS Monaco FC, in an eventual 2–0 win. In his final year, he played 16 games without scoring – the only time other than his first season that it happened in his career – as Werder won the league title. In total, he appeared in 424 Bundesliga matches, totalling 177 goals. When he retired he was in joint seventh place on the list of the Bundesliga's all-time leading scorers, tied with Dieter Müller.

International career
Allofs played for Germany a total of 56 times, scoring 17 goals. His first match was on 11 October 1978 in Prague, against Czechoslovakia, a 4–3 friendly win.

Allofs went on to play for the national side at the victorious UEFA Euro 1980 (where he scored three times to top the goalscoring charts, all in a 3–2 group stage win against the Netherlands), Euro 1984 and 1986 FIFA World Cup. Pushed to the sidelines by emerging stars Rudi Völler and Jürgen Klinsmann, he retired from international play on 31 March 1988, scoring in a friendly with Sweden.

Post-playing career

Ahead of the 1998–99 season Allofs was appointed head coach at former club Fortuna Düsseldorf. In April, with the club placed last in the table, he was fired.

In July 1999, Allofs became general manager of Werder Bremen. In the 2003–04 season he and head coach Thomas Schaaf led Bremen to the double of Bundesliga and DFB-Pokal. This success was followed by six qualifications to the UEFA Champions League. In the 2008–09 season they also reached the 2009 UEFA Cup Final.

In November 2012, Allofs left Bremen to join VfL Wolfsburg as their new sporting director, remaining there until December 2016.

Career statistics
Scores and results list Germany's goal tally first, score column indicates score after each Allofs goal.

Honours

As player
Fortuna Düsseldorf
DFB-Pokal: 1978–79, 1979–80
UEFA Cup Winners' Cup runner-up: 1978–79

1. FC Köln
DFB-Pokal: 1982–83
UEFA Cup runner-up: 1985–86

Marseille
Ligue 1: 1988–89
Coupe de France: 1988–89

Bordeaux
Ligue 1: runner-up 1989–90

Werder Bremen
Bundesliga: 1992–93
DFB-Pokal: 1990–91
UEFA Cup Winners' Cup: 1991–92

West Germany
UEFA European Championship: 1980
FIFA World Cup runner-up: 1986

Individual
Bundesliga top goalscorer: 1978–79, 1984–85
kicker Bundesliga Team of the Season: 1978–79, 1984–85, 1990–91
UEFA European Championship top goalscorer: 1980
UEFA Cup top goalscorer: 1985–86

As general manager
Werder Bremen
Bundesliga: 2003–04
DFB-Pokal: 2003–04
UEFA Cup runner-up: 2008–09

References

External links

 
 
 

1956 births
Living people
Footballers from Düsseldorf
German footballers
West German footballers
Association football forwards
Bundesliga players
Fortuna Düsseldorf players
1. FC Köln players
SV Werder Bremen players
Ligue 1 players
FC Girondins de Bordeaux players
Olympique de Marseille players
Germany international footballers
1986 FIFA World Cup players
UEFA Euro 1984 players
UEFA Euro 1980 players
UEFA European Championship-winning players
West German expatriate footballers
West German expatriate sportspeople in France
Expatriate footballers in France
Kicker-Torjägerkanone Award winners
German football managers
Fortuna Düsseldorf managers